Conestoga originally referred to the Conestoga people, an English name for the Susquehannock people of Pennsylvania.

Places
Conestogo, Ontario, a village north of Waterloo, Ontario (also spelled Conestoga)
Conestoga Township, Lancaster County, Pennsylvania
Conestoga Lake, Nebraska, United States
Conestogo Lake, Ontario, Canada
Conestoga Mall (Grand Island, Nebraska)
Conestoga Mall (Waterloo, Ontario), a shopping centre in Waterloo, Ontario
Conestoga Parkway, a freeway in Waterloo Region, Ontario, Canada
Conestoga River, a tributary of the Susquehanna River in the state of Pennsylvania
Conestogo River, a river near Waterloo, Ontario 

Vehicles
Conestoga wagon, a covered horse-drawn wagon
USS Conestoga, any of the three United States Navy ships named after the wagon
Conestoga (truck), a truck or truck trailer equipped with a soft roof and sides supported by a removable frame designed to protect cargo during transport similar to a closed truck while allowing by removal of the roof and sides for loading by forklift or crane, so named due to the resemblance to a Conestoga wagon.
Conestoga (rocket), the world's first privately funded commercial rocket, produced from Minuteman I stages
Conestoga (ship), a wrecked steamship in the Thousand Islands which is a popular Scuba diving site
C-93 Conestoga, a cargo aircraft
AL-60C-5 Conestoga, a variant of the Aermacchi AL.60 utility aircraft

Education
Conestoga High School, a public high school in Devon-Berwyn, Pennsylvania
Conestoga Middle School, a public 6-8 school in the Beaverton School District
Conestoga College Institute of Technology and Advanced Learning is a public college located in Kitchener, Ontario, Canada

In fiction
In Star Trek, the USS Conestoga is a starship used in the failed first attempt at deep space colonization
In Aliens (1986), the ship class of the spaceship USS Sulaco
In the video game Outpost 2, the name of a starship presented in the game

Other
Conestoga (convention), an annual literary science fiction convention held in Tulsa, Oklahoma
Conestoga Church of the Brethren, a congregation related to Conrad Beissel at the Ephrata Cloister
Conestoga Cigar, also known as a "stogie"
 Conestoga Massacre, Pennsylvania by the Paxton Boys in 1763
Conestoga Traction Company, a former American regional interurban trolley operated out of Lancaster, Pennsylvania
Conestoga, the company that manufactures the Big-Bang Cannon